Night Flyer: The Singer Songwriter Collection is a compilation album by American guitarist Tony Rice, released in 2008.

Previously unreleased tracks include "Pony", "Never Meant to Be", and "About Love".

Track listing 
 "Never Meant to Be" (Tony Rice) – 4:08  
 "Urge for Going" (Joni Mitchell) – 5:50  
 "Me and My Guitar" (James Taylor) – 3:59  
 "St. James Hospital" (James Baker) – 5:00  
 "John Wilkes Booth" (Mary Chapin Carpenter) – 3:54  
 "Four Strong Winds" (Ian Tyson) – 4:00  
 "Night Flyer" (John Mayall) – 4:01  
 "He Rode All the Way to Texas" (John Starling) – 3:32  
 "About Love" (Rice) – 3:43  
 "Changes" (Phil Ochs) – 2:21  
 "Sweetheart Like You" (Bob Dylan) – 4:33  
 "Green Light on the Southern" (Norman Blake) – 3:24  
 "Hard Love" (Bob Franke) – 4:23  
 "Why You Been Gone So Long" (Mickey Newbury) – 3:21  
 "Wayfaring Stranger" (Traditional) – 5:22  
 "Likes of Me" (Jerry Reed) – 2:53  
 "Pony" (Tom Waits) – 4:23

References 

2008 compilation albums
Tony Rice compilation albums
Rounder Records compilation albums